General elections were held in Lesotho on 17 February 2007. They had originally been scheduled to be held in April or May 2007. In October 2006, Tom Thabane left the ruling Lesotho Congress for Democracy (LCD) and formed a new party, the All Basotho Convention (ABC), and 17 other members of parliament joined him. This left the LCD with a narrow majority of 61 out of 120 seats. On the advice of Prime Minister Pakalitha Mosisili, King Letsie III dissolved parliament on November 24, 2006, and the election was scheduled for February 17, 2007.
 The bringing forward of the date caused dissatisfaction amongst the opposition, which expressed concern that it would not allow sufficient time for campaigning and electoral preparations. It was believed that the election was called early due to the possibility that there would be further defections from the LCD, depriving it of its majority.

80 constituency seats were up for election together with 40 seats allocated by proportional representation. The poll was monitored by the SADC and the American National Democratic Institute.

The electoral commission announced late on 20 February that the LCD had won 61 out of the 80 constituency seats, while the ABC won 17. The Alliance of Congress Parties won one constituency seat, and the vote in Makhaleng was delayed because a candidate there had died. The National Independent Party, which is allied with the LCD, won 21 seats through proportional representation, and the Lesotho Workers' Party, which is allied with the ABC, won 10 seats through proportional representation. ABC leader Tom Thabane called the vote free, but not fair.

An extended dispute has followed the election regarding the allocation of the seats based on proportional representation. Despite acknowledging that the LCD won the election, the ABC has argued that the proportional seats were not allocated correctly. The LCD's reluctance to engage in talks prompted Thabane on October 18, 2007 to threaten street protests to pressure the government into holding a new election "if they continue to fail to co-operate".

Results

By-elections
A by-election was held in Makhaleng on 30 June 2007 to determine the MP of that constituency; it was won by the LCD. Full results for the by-election were:

References

Elections in Lesotho
Lesotho
Parliamentary election
Election and referendum articles with incomplete results